is a Japanese voice actress affiliated with 81 Produce.

Filmography

Anime

Film

Video games

Dubbing

References

External links
 Official agency profile 
 

Living people
Voice actresses from Nagasaki Prefecture
81 Produce voice actors
Japanese video game actresses
Japanese voice actresses
20th-century Japanese actresses
21st-century Japanese actresses
1978 births